Near-infrared vein finder are devices used to try to increase the ability of healthcare providers to see veins. They use near-infrared light reflection to create a map of the veins. The received imagery is then either displayed on a screen or projected back onto the patient's skin. 

Unsurprisingly, they may not increase the success of starting intravenous catheters in children, since the difficulty may arise not in locating the vessel, but in physical manipulation of the needle.

Luminetx introduced a device called VeinViewer in 2006, and Accuvein introduced a product called Accuvein in 2008.  The machines in the United States cost about $15,000 as of 2015.

Nurses and other health care practitioner can easily pass IV cannula and other parenteral dosage with the help of a vein finder.

References

Vein-Check was produced by R B INCORPORATION IN 2014 IN INDIA AND COST ROUGHLY $100-$200
Augmented reality
Medical devices
Optical imaging